Fraispertuis City is a theme park in Jeanménil, France. It opened in 1966.

Its roller coaster Timber Drop, created by S&S Power, was the steepest in the world when it opened on July 2, 2011, but it lost the record with the opening on July 16, 2011, of Takabisha at Fuji-Q Highland in Japan.

Gallery

References

External links 
 Fraispertuis City (French)

Amusement parks in France
Western (genre) theme parks
Buildings and structures in Vosges (department)
Tourist attractions in Vosges (department)
1966 establishments in France